The John J. Montgomery Award was created by the National Society of Aerospace Professionals (NSAP) and the San Diego Aerospace Museum in 1962 for aerospace achievement. It was awarded from 1962 to at least 1964.

John J. Montgomery

The award bears the name of John Joseph Montgomery as the first American to fly in a heavier-than-air flying machine in 1884 near San Diego, California. Montgomery later designed gliders in 1903-1905 that were used for the first high-altitude flights by man in public exhibitions at Santa Clara, California and other locations. He died in 1911 experimenting with a new glider design near San Jose, California. Montgomery was also one of the first Americans to investigate the science of aerodynamics using principles of physics.

Recipients

1962
The NASA X-15 Program. Seven X-15 pilots and Paul F. Bikle, the then Director of NASA Flight Research Center at Edwards Air Force Base, were awarded the first John J. Montgomery Award for aerospace achievement. The pilots were: Scott Crossfield, Maj. Robert M. White, Neil A. Armstrong, John B. McKay, Joseph A. Walker, Cdr. Forrest S. Petersen, and Maj. Robert A. Rushworth.

1963
Project Mercury. 26 people associated with Project Mercury including astronauts M. Scott Carpenter, L. Gordon Cooper, Jr., John H. Glenn, Jr., Virgil I. Grissom, Alan B. Shepard, Jr., Donald K. Slayton, and Walter M. Schirra, Jr.; Dr. Robert R. Gilruth, MSC Director; Dr. Walter C. Williams, NASA Deputy Associate Administrator; Kenneth S. Kleinknecht, Project Mercury Manager; Christopher C. Kraft, Jr., Project Mercury Flight Operations Director; Maxime A. Faget, Assistant Director of Engineering and Development; Dr. Charles A. Berry, Medical Operations Chief; Lt. Col. John A. Powers (USAF) (nickname "Shorty"), Mercury Public Affairs Officer; and John Finley Yardley, Mercury Launch Operations Manager.

1964
The Polaris Program was selected from 13 candidate programs. Awardees included Charles Stark Draper, Derald Stuart, and Dr. George F. Mechlin.

See also

 List of aviation awards

References

External links
Photos of 1962 recipients with Montgomery Awards
Photo of Virgil Grissom's Montgomery Award from 1963
Spearman, Arthur Dunning John J. Montgomery: Father of Basic Flying. Santa Clara University 1967 and 2nd ed. 1977.
Harwood, Craig S. and Fogel, Gary B. Quest for Flight: John J. Montgomery and the Dawn of Aviation in the West. University of Oklahoma Press 2012.

Aviation awards